Anti-competitive practices are business or government practices that prevent or reduce competition in a market. Antitrust laws differ among state and federal laws to ensure businesses do not engage in competitive practices that harm other, usually smaller, businesses or consumers. These laws are formed to promote healthy competition within a free market by limiting the abuse of monopoly power. Competition allows companies to compete in order for products and services to improve; promote innovation; and provide more choices for consumers. In order to obtain greater profits, some large enterprises take advantage of market power to hinder survival of new entrants. Anti-competitive behavior can undermine the efficiency and fairness of the market, leaving consumers with little choice to obtain a reasonable quality of service.

Anti-competitive behaviour is used by business and governments to lessen competition within the markets so that monopolies and dominant firms can generate supernormal profits and deter competitors from the market. Therefore, it is heavily regulated and punishable by law in cases where it substantially affects the market.

Anti-competitive practices are commonly only deemed illegal when the practice results in a substantial dampening in competition, hence why for a firm to be punished for any form of anti-competitive behaviour they generally need to be a monopoly or a dominant firm in a duopoly or oligopoly who has significant influence over the market.

Anti-competitive behaviour can be grouped into two classifications. Horizontal restraints regard anti-competitive behaviour that involves competitors at the same level of the supply chain. These practices include mergers, cartels, collusions, price-fixing, price discrimination and predatory pricing. On the other hand, the second category is vertical restraint which implements restraints against competitors due to anti-competitive practice between firms at different levels of the supply chain e.g. supplier-distributor relationships. These practices include exclusive dealing, refusal to deal/sell, resale price maintenance and more.

Types 
 Dumping, also known as predatory pricing, is a commercial strategy for which a company sells a product at an aggressively low price in a competitive market at a loss. A company with large market share and the ability to temporarily sacrifice selling a product or service at below average cost can drive competitors out of the market, after which the company would be free to raise prices for a greater profit. For example, many developing countries have accused China of dumping. In 2006, the country was accused of dumping silk and satin in the Indian markets at a cheaper rate which affected the local manufacturers adversely.
 Exclusive dealing, where a retailer or wholesaler is obliged by contract to only purchase from the contracted supplier. This mechanism prevents retailers to lessen profit maximisation and/or consumer choice. In 1999, Dentsply entered a 7 years court complaint by the U.S, the dental wholesaler had been successfully sued for using monopoly power to restrain trade using exclusive dealings within contract requirements.
 Price fixing, where companies collude to set prices, effectively dismantling the free market by not engaging in competition with each other. In 2018, travel agency giant, Flight Centre was fined $12.5 million for encouraging a collusive price fixing plan between 3 international airlines from between 2005 and 2009.
 Refusal to deal, e.g., two companies agree not to use a certain vendor. In 2010, Cabcharge refused, on commercial terms, to allow its non-cash payment instruments to be accepted and processed electronically by Travel Tab/Mpos' system for the payment of taxi fares. Travel Tab/Mpos requested access to the instruments but Cabcharge refused twice. Penalties for the first and second refusal were $2 million and $9 million respectively.
 Dividing territories, an agreement by two companies to stay out of each other's way and reduce competition in the agreed-upon territories. Also known as 'market sharing', a practice in which businesses geographically divide or allocate customers using contractual agreements that include non-competition on established customers, not producing the same goods or services and/or selling within specific regions. Boral and CSR formed a pre-mix concrete cartel and were penalised for bid rigging, price fixing and market sharing at an amount over $6.6million and a maximum of $100,000 on each of the 6 executives involved. The companies had agreed to recognise clients as belonging to suppliers without competition over regular meetings and phone conversations. Company market shares were monitored to ensure the agreement was not breached - this led to over-charging on construction quotes which were used by federal, state and local government projects.
 Tying, where products that are not naturally related must be purchased together. This incumbent strategy forces the buyer to purchase an unnecessary product from a separate market, implicitly lessening competition in various markets by increasing unnatural barriers to entry as entrants are unable to compete on a full line of products nor on price. In 2006, Apple iTunes iPod lost a $10 million 10 year antitrust case when iPods sold between September 2006 to March 2009 that were only compatible with tracks from the iTunes Store or those downloaded from CDs.
 Price discrimination, when a product or service is offered to different consumers at different prices in different markets. Examples include student and senior discounts for transport, well-packaged books versus paperback editions, differences in the price of lunch and dinner in restaurants, or airfare differences. Lott and Roberts (1991) argue that there are cost or other explanations for these phenomena and provide an explanation for these situations.
 Resale price maintenance, when a manager sells to a distributor, the resale price is agreed to not fall below a specified minimum value. However, when the retail price decreases, the manufacturer does sell more products. This is interesting from a management perspective. This strategy is controversial, and the benefits are to protect some inefficient small stores or manufacturers from competition threats. But at the same time, this strategy can easily lead to the level price cartel of brand operators.

Also criticized are:
 Absorption of a competitor or competing technology, where a powerful firm effectively co-opts or swallows its competitor rather than see it either compete directly or be absorbed by another firm
 Subsidies from government which allow a firm to function without being profitable, giving them an advantage over competition or effectively barring competition
 Regulations which place costly restrictions on firms that less wealthy firms cannot afford to implement
 Protectionism, tariffs and quotas which give firms insulation from competitive forces
 Patent misuse and copyright misuse, such as fraudulently obtaining a patent, copyright, or other form of intellectual property; or using such legal devices to gain advantage in an unrelated market
 Digital rights management which prevents owners from selling used media, as would normally be allowed by the first sale doctrine.

Horizontal mergers 

Horizontal merger refers to improving efficiency by reducing consumer distortion of firm choice and price heterogeneity. When two companies with similar products or product characteristics merge horizontally, there is less competition. However, a net social benefit can be created, because when the two companies fight a continuous price war due to fierce competition, it will strongly distort the choices of consumers. Horizontal mergers can also easily lead to a monopoly, reducing consumers' choices and indirectly harming consumers' interests.

Vertical mergers 
The Chicago school of economics argues that vertical mergers, usually formed under anti-competitive intention, may be pro-competitive to eliminate double marginalisation. A chain of monopolists under can cause prices that extract beyond consumer surplus as wholesalers mark up prices, retailers have the power to transfer this cost price onto the retail price.

Effects 

Monopolies and oligopolies are often accused of, and sometimes found guilty of, anti-competitive practices. Anti-competitive incentives can be especially prominent when a corporation's majority shareholders own similarly sized stakes in the company's industry competitors.  For this reason, company mergers are often examined closely by government regulators to avoid reducing competition in an industry. Although anti-competitive practices often enrich those who practice them, they are generally believed to have a negative effect on the economy as a whole, and to disadvantage competing firms and consumers who are not able to avoid their effects, generating a significant social cost. For these reasons, most countries have competition laws to prevent anti-competitive practices, and government regulators to aid the enforcement of these laws.

The argument that anti-competitive practices have a negative effect on the economy arises from the belief that a freely functioning efficient market economy, composed of many market participants each of which has limited market power, will not permit monopoly profits to be earned...and consequently prices to consumers will be lower, and if anything there will be a wider range of products supplied.

A key distinguishing factor that separates anti-competitive behaviour from innovative marketing and fair competition is that most of the aforementioned types of anti-competitive behaviour are only deemed unlawful if the firm that is committing the behaviour is a dominant firm within in the market to the extent where their action will have a significant influence on market behaviour. If the firm engages in such behaviour has a position of substantial market share, so much so that they are able to generate supernormal profits and force smaller companies out of the industry then it is most likely deemed unlawful.

Opponents of robber barons believe that the realities of the marketplace are sometimes more complex than this or similar theories of competition would suggest. For example, oligopolistic firms may achieve economies of scale that would elude smaller firms.  Again, very large firms, whether quasi-monopolies or oligopolies, may achieve levels of sophistication e.g. in business process and/or planning (that benefit end consumers) and that smaller firms would not easily attain. There are undoubtedly industries (e.g. airlines and pharmaceuticals) in which the levels of investment are so high that only extremely large firms that may be quasi-monopolies in some areas of their businesses can survive.

Many governments regard these market niches as natural monopolies, and believe that the inability to allow full competition is balanced by government regulation. However, the companies in these niches tend to believe that they should avoid regulation, as they are entitled to their monopoly position by fiat. In some cases, anti-competitive behavior can be difficult to distinguish from competition. For instance, a distinction must be made between product bundling, which is a legal market strategy, and product tying, which violates antitrust law. Some advocates of laissez-faire capitalism (such as Monetarists, some Neoclassical economists, and the heterodox economists of the Austrian school) reject the term, seeing all "anti-competitive behavior" as forms of competition that benefit consumers.

Common actions
Unfair competition includes a number of areas of law involving acts by one competitor or group of competitors which harm another in the field, and which may give rise to criminal offenses and civil causes of action. The most common actions falling under the banner of unfair competition include:
 Matters pertaining to antitrust law, known in the European Union as competition law. Antitrust violations constituting unfair competition occur when one competitor attempts to force others out of the market (or prevent others from entering the market) through tactics such as predatory pricing or obtaining exclusive purchase rights to raw materials needed to make a competing product.
 Trademark infringement and passing off, which occur when the maker of a product uses a name, logo, or other identifying characteristics to deceive consumers into thinking that they are buying the product of a competitor. In the United States, this form of unfair competition is prohibited under the common law and by state statutes, and governed at the federal level by the Lanham Act.
 Misappropriation of trade secrets, which occurs when one competitor uses espionage, bribery, or outright theft to obtain economically advantageous information in the possession of another. In the United States, this type of activity is forbidden by the Uniform Trade Secrets Act and the Economic Espionage Act of 1996.
 Trade libel, the spreading of false information about the quality or characteristics of a competitor's products, is prohibited at common law.
 Tortious interference, which occurs when one competitor convinces a party having a relationship with another competitor to breach a contract with, or duty to, the other competitor is also prohibited at common law.

Various unfair business practices such as fraud, misrepresentation, and unconscionable contracts may be considered unfair competition, if they give one competitor an advantage over others. In the European Union, each member state must regulate unfair business practices in accordance with the principles laid down in the Unfair Commercial Practices Directive, subject to transitional periods.

Anti-competitive practices in different market systems 
Based on the research from Long in 2018, it observed that, the Anti-competitive is not only an industry regulation behavior, but also a modern industry characteristics for stakeholders to compete in within an fair market system. Meanwhile, the research results also significantly involved the economic theories to predict the relevant encouragement. This article explained the relevant variables in determining the extent of anti-competitive markets too. While in perfectly competitive market, the anti-competitive practices is not necessary, since each business already have full information on their competitors pricing, strategy and major actions. While, in the monopolist market system, the anti-competitive practices will become a  significantly useful method to reduce the manipulation of business giants and potential colluding actions. Furthermore, the research emphasized the market conduct of state monopolies is no different from that of other firms and market power serves as the motivation for anti-competitive behaviour of firms.

The effectiveness of anti-competitive practices in national stabilization 
Meanwhile, in description of the economic approach, the anti-competitive practices is also a useful approach to sustain a stabilized economic development and national welfare. With the implementation of anti-competitive practices, it will effectively remove the market inefficiencies and eliminate the dead weight loss from the economic viewpoint. As firms engage in the fair competition act with the government regulations and laws. There is sufficient evidence to conclude that, the utilization of anti-competitive practices can dramatically reduce the phenomenon of black market, hence improves the investment incentives on aggregate demands. In general, with the effective implementation of anti-competitive practices, the whole economy will expand into a further prosperity with less crowing out effects.

See also
 
 Anti-competitive practices of Apple Inc.
 Competition law
 Loss leader
 Natural monopoly
 Parker immunity doctrine
 Predatory pricing
 Price discrimination
 Trade regulation law
 Embrace, extend, and extinguish
 Category killer
 European Union competition law
 Unfair business practices
 United States antitrust law

References

External links 
 https://web.archive.org/web/20031224114200/http://usinfo.state.gov/journals/ites/0299/ijee/klein.htm